Linda Staudt (born August 29, 1958 in Windsor, Ontario) is a retired female long-distance runner from Canada. She won the 1981 edition of the Tokyo International Women's Marathon, clocking a total time of 2:34:28.

She is now serving as the Director for the London District Catholic School Board.

Achievements

References

1958 births
Living people
Canadian female long-distance runners
Canadian female marathon runners
Sportspeople from Windsor, Ontario
Track and field athletes from Ontario
University of Windsor alumni